Trobni Dol is a settlement in the Municipality of Laško in eastern Slovenia. It lies in hills east of Laško. The area is part of the traditional region of Styria. It is now included with the rest of the municipality in the Savinja Statistical Region.

Church

A chapel in the settlement is dedicated to Saint Barbara. It was built in 1993.

References

External links
Dol on Geopedia

Populated places in the Municipality of Laško